Brad Yeager is an American politician. He serves as a Republican member for the 56th district of the Florida House of Representatives.

Life and career 
Yeager attended Charlotte High School.

In August 2022, Yeager defeated Scott Moore and Jayden Cocuzza in the Republican primary election for the 56th district of the Florida House of Representatives. No candidate was nominated to challenge him in the general election. He assumed office in November 2022.

References 

Living people
Year of birth missing (living people)
Place of birth missing (living people)
Republican Party members of the Florida House of Representatives
21st-century American politicians